Kozhuvallur (Kozhuvalloor) is a small village in the Chengannur taluk of Alappuzha district in India.  It is situated about 10 km south of the town of Chengannur and about 8 km northwest of Pandalam. The road to Kozhuvallur from Chengannur deviates at Chammathu Mukku Junction on the Chengannur-Mavelikkara Road before Kodukulanji. From the Pandalam side, the road to Kozhuvalloor branches at Kulanada on the Main Central (MC) Road. Administratively, Kozhuvalloor lies under the jurisdiction of Mulakkuzha Panchayat. It is separated from the nearby Venmony village by a large strip of paddy field called Changapadam. The physical features of the area follow the typical midland geographical pattern of Kerala, consisting of lush vegetation, fertile wet fields, and hilly terrain.

Demographics

The name Kozhuvalloor may be described as signifying a "Village of Peasants". Indeed, the village has a significant population of farmers and is famous for good quality betel leaf, arecanut, banana, rubber and tapioca. In addition to farming, many villagers have traveled to the Gulf countries after the Gulf boom to make their living, and many younger residents have joined the Indian Army and Border Security Force.

The western side of Kozhuvalloor is a comparatively affluent area, and has recently been settled predominantly by Syrian Christians from Venmony and Kodukulanji. Hindus form the majority in the eastern regions of the village. The village's castes include Nair, Ezhava, Viswakarma, Pulaya, and Kurava.

Major Landmarks

Kozhuvalloor Devi Temple is an ancient place of worship for the Hindus. The grand celebration of Kumbha Karthika, an important festival  at the Devi Temple during the Malayalam month of Kumbham (February–March) is an occasion for rejoicing at the village. 
SNDP LP School provides basic education till 4th grade. Villagers also worship in the Guru Mandirams commemorating the Saint, Sri Narayana Guru. 
The Roman Catholic Church of the Latin Rite is a striking landmark with its majestic granite stone structure. 
The Salem Marthoma Church and the CSI St. Andrew's Church and CSI St. Thomas Church and St. George Orthodox church are also important churches with many years of history in the region. 
Salem school is an important identity mark providing education till high school where many of the residents studied and then moved up to higher education later.
Parachantha is also a major landmark with many shops and markets.
St. George Senior Secondary School situated near the St. George's Orthodox Church on the Kalarithara Hills imparts school education in the CBSE stream. Mount Zion Institute of Science & Technology and 
St. Thomas College Of Engineering are situated in Kozhuvalloor.

Transport
Most of the villagers have their own vehicles. There are also private and state transport buses connecting Chengannur and Pandalam through Kozhuvalloor and is available from Chengannur and Pandalam private bus stands and Kerala State Road Transport Corporation bus stands.

Scenery
The village is surrounded by paddy fields, hills and greenery.
Also lengthy rubber fields can be seen. Though the cultivation and farming has decreased, the whole village looks green.

References

Villages in Alappuzha district